Kitchener South—Hespeler is a federal electoral district in the Waterloo Region of Ontario, Canada, that has been represented in the House of Commons of Canada since the 2015 election.

History
Kitchener South—Hespeler was created from parts of the Kitchener—Conestoga, Kitchener Centre, and Cambridge electoral districts as a result of a redistribution process conducted by Elections Canada from 2012 to 2013.

Geography

Following the 2011 Census and a Canadian Parliament decision to increase the number of Federal electoral districts from 308 to 338, Elections Canada conducted a redistribution process that began with the establishment of Electoral Boundaries Commissions for each province in 2012. As a result of the work of the Electoral Boundaries Commission for the Province of Ontario, which was concluded in July 2013, the Kitchener South—Hespeler district was created from parts of the Kitchener—Conestoga, Kitchener Centre, and Cambridge electoral districts.

The new Kitchener South—Hespeler electoral district includes: 
 The portion of the City of Cambridge lying northerly of Ontario Highway 401
 The portion of the City of Kitchener lying: 
 Southerly of the Conestoga Parkway
 Easterly of Fischer-Hallman Road
 Westerly of Ontario Highway 8 between the Conestoga Parkway and Fairway Road
 Westerly of the border between the cities of Cambridge and Kitchener between Fairway Road and Ontario Highway 401

Members of Parliament

Electoral history

See also 

 List of Canadian federal electoral districts
 Past Canadian electoral districts

Notes

External links 

 Website of the Parliament of Canada
Kitchener South—Hespeler Conservative Electoral District Association
Green Party of Canada - Kitchener South—Hespeler
Kitchener South—Hespeler Federal Liberal Electoral District Association
Kitchener South—Hespeler NDP Federal Electoral District Association

Ontario federal electoral districts
Politics of Cambridge, Ontario
Politics of Kitchener, Ontario